CEST or cest may refer to:

 Central European Summer Time (UTC+2), daylight saving time observed in the central European time zone
 Cognitive-Experiential Self-Theory
 Chemical Exchange Saturation Transfer, a subset of Magnetization transfer in MRI
 Cest, a woman's girdle
 Cest or Cesti, informal or plural for Cestus, an ancient battle glove
The "Check Employment Status for Tax" online tool used for assessing contractors' employment status for IR35 purposes under UK tax law

See also
 Cesta, Kočevje